Nicolae Moiceanu (born 6 December 1927) was a Romanian bobsledder. He competed in the four-man event at the 1956 Winter Olympics.

References

External links
 

1927 births
Possibly living people
Romanian male bobsledders
Olympic bobsledders of Romania
Bobsledders at the 1956 Winter Olympics
Place of birth missing